Monomethyl auristatin is any of a group of synthetic antineoplastic agents derived from the sea slug Dolabella auricularia:

 Monomethyl auristatin E
 Monomethyl auristatin F